Žerjav is a settlement in northern Slovenia.

Žerjav is also a surname. It may refer to:
 Gregor Žerjav (1882–1929), Slovene politician
 Nadina Abarth-Žerjav (1912–2000), Slovene-Italian businesswoman
 Radovan Žerjav (born 1968), Slovene politician

See also
 

Slovene-language surnames